The Mankato Mets were a professional minor league baseball team that existed from 1967 to 1968 in the Northern League. Located in Mankato, Minnesota, the team was affiliated with the New York Mets for its entire existence. The Mets played at Key City Park during both years of operation.

Year-by-year record

References

New York Mets minor league affiliates
Baseball teams established in 1967
Baseball teams disestablished in 1968
1967 establishments in Minnesota
1968 disestablishments in Minnesota
Defunct baseball teams in Minnesota
Northern League (1902-71) baseball teams
Mankato, Minnesota